The Blaze, previously known as Lightning, are a women's cricket team that represent the East Midlands region, one of eight regional hubs in English domestic women's cricket. They play their home matches at various grounds, including Trent Bridge and Grace Road. They are captained by Kathryn Bryce and coached by Chris Guest. The team carries over many elements of the WCSL team Loughborough Lightning. They are partnered with Nottinghamshire, Leicestershire, Derbyshire and Lincolnshire.

History
In 2020, women's cricket in England was restructured, creating eight new 'regional hub' teams, with the intention of playing both 50-over and 20-over cricket. The team, then known as Lightning, were one of the sides created under this structure, effectively replacing the Women's Cricket Super League team Loughborough Lightning and representing the East Midlands, partnering with Nottinghamshire, Leicestershire, Derbyshire and Lincolnshire, as well as Loughborough University. The side was to be captained by Kathryn Bryce and coached by Rob Taylor. Due to the COVID-19 pandemic, the 2020 season was truncated, and only 50-over cricket was played, in the Rachael Heyhoe Flint Trophy. Lightning finished bottom of the North Group in the competition, winning two of their six matches. At the end of the season, five Lightning players were given full-time domestic contracts, the first of their kind in England: Kathryn Bryce, Sarah Bryce, Bethan Ellis, Lucy Higham and Abigail Freeborn.

The following season, 2021, Lightning competed in both the Rachael Heyhoe Flint Trophy and the newly-formed Twenty20 competition, the Charlotte Edwards Cup. In the Charlotte Edwards Cup the side finished bottom of their group, losing all six of their matches. In the Rachael Heyhoe Flint Trophy, Lightning finished fourth in the group of eight, winning three of their seven matches. In the final match of the season, Lightning scored 320/6 in their victory over Central Sparks, with the Bryce sisters, Kathryn and Sarah, sharing a 207-run partnership, the highest across the competition. Lightning bowler Kirstie Gordon was the leading wicket-taker in the competition, with 16 wickets. Rob Taylor left his role as Head Coach at the end of the season, and was later replaced by Chris Guest.

Lightning again finished bottom of their group in the Charlotte Edwards Cup in 2022, but did win their first Twenty20 match, beating North West Thunder by 5 wickets. In September 2022, it was announced that Nottinghamshire CCC would become the new host of the team, replacing Loughborough University, and it was also announced that the name of the team would change. The side finished sixth out of eight in the 2022 Rachael Heyhoe Flint Trophy.

In November 2022, it was announced that the team had been renamed The Blaze.

Home grounds

Players

Current squad
As per 2022 season.
 No. denotes the player's squad number, as worn on the back of their shirt.
  denotes players with international caps.

Academy
The Blaze Academy team plays against other regional academies in friendly and festival matches across various formats. The Academy selects players from across the East Midlands region, and includes some players who are also in the first team squad. Players in the 2023 Academy are listed below:

Overseas players
  Piepa Cleary – Australia (2022)

Coaching staff

 Head coach: Chris Guest
 Regional Director: James Cutt
 Assistant coach: Jon Bateson
 Team Operations Executive: Sally Clarke

As of the 2022 season.

Seasons

Rachael Heyhoe Flint Trophy

Charlotte Edwards Cup

Statistics

Rachael Heyhoe Flint Trophy

 Abandoned matches are counted as NR (no result)
 Win or loss by super over or boundary count are counted as tied.

Charlotte Edwards Cup

 Abandoned matches are counted as NR (no result)
 Win or loss by super over or boundary count are counted as tied.

Records

Rachael Heyhoe Flint Trophy
Highest team total: 320/6, v Central Sparks on 18 September 2021.
Lowest (completed) team total: 116 v North West Thunder on 13 September 2020.
Highest individual score: 162, Kathryn Bryce v Central Sparks on 18 September 2021.
Best individual bowling analysis: 5/29, Kathryn Bryce v Northern Diamonds on 5 September 2020 and 5/29, Grace Ballinger v North West Thunder on 9 July 2022.
Most runs: 727 runs in 18 matches, Kathryn Bryce.
Most wickets: 28 wickets in 18 matches, Kathryn Bryce and 28 wickets in 14 matches, Kirstie Gordon.

Charlotte Edwards Cup
Highest team total: 155/5, v North West Thunder on 21 May 2022.
Lowest (completed) team total: 81 v Central Sparks on 10 July 2021.
Highest individual score: 61, Abigail Freeborn v South East Stars on 25 August 2021.
Best individual bowling analysis: 3/30, Lucy Higham v Southern Vipers on 29 May 2022.
Most runs: 161 runs in 6 matches, Abigail Freeborn.
Most wickets: 10 wickets in 9 matches, Kathryn Bryce.

See also
 Derbyshire Women cricket team
 Leicestershire Women cricket team
 Lincolnshire Women cricket team
 Nottinghamshire Women cricket team
 Loughborough Lightning (women's cricket)

References

 
2020 establishments in England
Cricket at Loughborough University
Nottinghamshire County Cricket Club
Leicestershire County Cricket Club
Derbyshire County Cricket Club
Cricket in Nottinghamshire
Cricket in Leicestershire
Cricket clubs established in 2020
English Domestic Women's Cricket Regional Hub teams